I Like Men! is a 1959 studio album recorded by Peggy Lee, arranged and conducted by Jack Marshall.

Track listing
 "Charley, My Boy" (Ted Fio Rito, Gus Kahn) – 1:35
 "Good-For-Nothin' Joe" (Rube Bloom, Ted Koehler) – 2:32
 "I Love to Love" (Herbert Baker) – 2:51
 "When a Woman Loves a Man" (Bernie Hanighen, Gordon Jenkins, Johnny Mercer) – 2:46
 "I Like Men!" (Peggy Lee, Jack Marshall) – 2:06
 "I'm Just Wild About Harry" (Eubie Blake, Noble Sissle) – 2:09
 "My Man" (Jacques Charles, Channing Pollock, Albert Willemetz, and Maurice Yvain) – 2:13
 "Bill" (Oscar Hammerstein II, Jerome Kern, P.G. Wodehouse) – 2:46
 "So in Love" (Cole Porter) – 2:33
 "Jim" (Caesar Petrillo, Edward Ross, Nelson Shawn) – 2:59
 "It's So Nice to Have a Man Around the House" (Jack Elliot, Harold Spina) – 2:22
 "Oh Johnny, Oh Johnny, Oh!" (Abe Olman, Ed Rose) – 1:47

Personnel
 Peggy Lee – vocals
 Jack Marshall – arranger and conductor

References

1959 albums
Peggy Lee albums
Capitol Records albums
Albums arranged by Jack Marshall (composer)
Albums produced by Milt Gabler
Albums conducted by Jack Marshall